Tzruya (or Tsruya) "Suki" Lahav (born 1951) is an Israeli violinist, vocalist, actress, lyricist, screenwriter, and novelist. Lahav was a member of Bruce Springsteen's E Street Band from September 1974 to March 1975, then returned to Israel and found success there.

Biography
Tzruya Lahav was born and raised in Kibbutz Ayelet HaShahar in the Upper Galilee in Israel, where she played kibbutz harvest music as well as classical music, growing up.

1970s and 1980s
Following her service in the Israeli military, she arrived in the United States in 1971 with her husband Louis Lahav, a recording engineer who in 1972 began working with Springsteen, who in turn was looking for a violinist.  On record with Springsteen, most of Suki Lahav's parts did not make it to released form, but she sang the choir-like vocals on "4th of July, Asbury Park (Sandy)" from the album The Wild, The Innocent and The E Street Shuffle and played violin on "Jungleland" from the Born to Run album.  In concert, Lahav's violin   were a focal point of slow songs during Springsteen's shows of this time, and her "pale" "willowy" presence on stage contrasted with Springsteen's.

During their time in the US, a daughter, Tal was born. She was killed in a road accident at the age of three and a half. They returned to Israel in the spring of 1975.

The couple divorced in 1977. Lahav, now known by her Hebrew name Tzruya (or sometimes transliterated as Tsruya), was briefly married to the actor Shabtai Konorti. After the divorce, she established a family with Moshe Albalek in Jerusalem. By 1985, she had two children and little involvement in the music industry. Then she began working as a violinist and violist, appearing with the Israeli Kibbutz Orchestra, and as an actress.

1990s and 2000s
She became a successful lyricist, writing for prominent musicians and singers in Israel; "Shara Barkhovot" ("Singing in the Streets"), the Israeli entry in the Eurovision Song Contest 1990 performed by Rita, featured her words, and some of her songs are considered icons of Israeli music.  She also recast existing song lyrics from other languages into Hebrew, such as the Leonard Cohen song "Famous Blue Raincoat" in 1993. In 1999, she wrote the lyrics for the multi-ethnic collaborative, Glykeria's recording "Tfilat Ha'imahot" ("The Mothers' Prayer"), which also featured Amal Murkus and Yehudit Tamir. In 2003, the album No Longer the Sea: A Collection Of Tzruya Lahav's Songs was released, featuring performances by Rita, Yehudit Ravitz, Meir Banai, Yehuda Poliker, and others.  Her songs have also been performed by Israeli artists Gidi Gov, Rami Kleinstein, and Ricky Gal. In 2004, a show of her songs was produced in Tel Aviv.

Lahav authored screenplays, including the 1996 Israeli crime film Kesher Dam, and two novels: Andre’s Wooden Clogs (Kinneret, 2002), based on the true-life story of a boy's survival of The Holocaust in the Netherlands (in Hebrew, also translated to Dutch, Italian ), and The Swamp Queen Does The Tango (Am Oved, 2004), an adult fairy tale (in Hebrew). Both books won numerous awards and prizes for literature, including the Yad Vashem Prize and the Minister of Culture's prize for first work. She also teaches creative writing in Jerusalem, where she lives in the German Colony neighborhood.

References

Sources
 Steven Allan, Interview with Suki Lahav.  Backstreets magazine, December 1985.
 Cross, Charles R. Backstreets: Springsteen - The Man and His Music. Harmony Books, 1989/1992. .
 Graff, Gary. The Ties That Bind: Bruce Springsteen A to E to Z. Visible Ink Press, 2005. .

External links

 Short biography (English)
 Another short biography (Hebrew, but has photo)

1951 births
Living people
20th-century Israeli women singers
Israeli violinists
Israeli stage actresses
Israeli songwriters
Israeli novelists
Israeli female screenwriters
Israeli Jews
E Street Band members
Place of birth missing (living people)
Hebrew-language writers
Israeli women novelists
Israeli expatriates in the United States
21st-century violinists